Georgi Fortunov (born 9 September 1957) is a Bulgarian former cyclist. He competed in the team time trial event at the 1976 Summer Olympics.

References

External links
 

1957 births
Living people
Bulgarian male cyclists
Olympic cyclists of Bulgaria
Cyclists at the 1976 Summer Olympics
Place of birth missing (living people)